, originally named , is a racing video game released for the PlayStation Vita as a launch title on 17 December 2011 in Japan, 22 February 2012 in Europe, 23 February in Australia and 13 March in North America. It is the 5th handheld game in the Ridge Racer series.

The game was developed by Cellius and published by Namco Bandai Games. The game continues the Ridge Racer tradition of arcade racing and supports single-player as well as local and Wi-Fi multiplayer games.

Upon release, Ridge Racer was mostly panned by video game critics.

Downloadable content
The Hornet from Sega's Daytona USA makes a cameo appearance as available DLC, as well as an exclusive song (with lyrics by Takenobu Mitsuyoshi) and course inspired by both franchises. Other cameos include cars with paint schemes derived from The Idolmaster, as well as DoCoMO and Pac-Man-themed versions of the Kamata SYNCi, the game's cover car. The DoCoMo and Idolmaster cars are not available outside Japan. Other downloadable content include new cars and courses, as well as music tracks from previous entries in the franchise.

Reception

Ridge Racer received "generally unfavorable reviews" according to the review aggregation website Metacritic. In Japan, Famitsu gave it a score of one eight and three sevens for a total of 29 out of 40. Elsewhere, it was critically panned by various publications for its barebones nature and a lack of proper progression, unlike other installments in the series. GameSpot criticized the game's lack of initial content (which consisted only of a limited number of cars and tracks ported from Ridge Racer 7) as a ploy to force users to buy its downloadable content (while its first DLC pack, despite being available for free as a limited time offer, only consisted of more content originating from Ridge Racer 7), resulting in a poor experience that lacked any of the variety of past installments. In conclusion, the game was considered "a complete and utter ripoff", as a cheap cash-in than a fully thought-out product. IGN similarly criticized the game's absolute lack of storyline or progression-based modes or leagues, and unbalanced online races that use a leveling system to determine a player's top speed (giving an unfair disadvantage to newer players). Ridge Racer was described as tech demo, wrapped up in an online-reliant social framework that's fundamentally flawed on several levels. In June 2012, IGN also named Ridge Racer one of its ten "Worst Video Games of 2012 So Far".

Notes

References

External links
  

2011 video games
Bandai Namco games
Multiplayer and single-player video games
Crossover racing games
Multiplayer online games
PlayStation Vita games
PlayStation Vita-only games
Racing video games
Ridge Racer
Video games developed in Japan
Video games scored by Yuu Miyake